"Ouragan" (French for "windstorm"), also released in English under the title "Irresistible", is the first single recorded by Princess Stéphanie of Monaco, from her debut album Besoin. Released in 1986, it was a great success in France, where it topped the charts for almost three months, and in Germany.

Background and writing
This song was written by Romano Musumarra, who had already written several hits for Jeanne Mas and Elsa. Yves Roze, the song's producer, is known under the pseudonym of Jean-François Michael, who recorded "Adieu jolie Candy" in 1969/

When Jeanne Mas refused to record the song, the composer offered it to Stéphanie of Monaco, who finally accepted. The song was also recorded in English, under the name "Irresistible", in order to win over the Anglophones and other non-French speaking peoples - but with little success.

No music video was produced initially, as the song was not expected to be such a success. The only video available was some footage shot in the recording studio. Eventually a video was made that features the princess in various locations pursuing a mysterious stranger in a hat. At the end of the video, in a significant plot twist, the stranger is revealed to be a male version of Stéphanie with slightly slicked down hair and little makeup. The video runs for 5:20 and uses a remix of the song that alternates between the original French lyrics and the English lyrics for "Irresistible."

Chart performances
"Ouragan" had a huge success in France, peaking at number one for ten consecutive weeks. It debuted at number seventeen on the  chart edition of 5 April 1986 and rocketed up the chart, reaching the top position on 26 April, and charted for a total of 29 weeks until 18 October 1986. It peaked at number eleven in Switzerland and was also a hit in Germany, where it reached number two.

In 1986, it was certified Platinum Single by the French certifier SNEP, having achieved at least one million sales.

"Ouragan" was the first single to remain at the top of the French Singles Chart for at least ten weeks, beating the record set in 1985 by Peter and Sloane with "Besoin de rien, envie de toi". It was also the second best-selling single in 1986, behind "Les Démons de minuit", by Images.

Cover versions
The song was covered by many artists, including Ishii, Akemi (石井明美) in Japanese version from her 1986 album Mona Lisa, Michael von der Heide in 1998, Gregorian in a new age version as bonus track on the album Masters of Chant Chapter III, Leslie on her 2007 album 80 Souvenirs, Jolie in French and English versions in 2010. Actors Jean-Paul Rouve and Isabelle Nanty performed the song as duet in the Olivier Baroux's 2011 film Les Tuche. After a live performance of the song in 2012, Italian singer Sabrina Salerno released the song as a digital download in 2015, however the song was never promoted as a single.

Track listings

 7" single
A-side :
 "Ouragan" — 3:40
B-side :
 "Irresistible" — 3:45

 12" maxi
A-side :
 "Ouragan" — 7:00
B-side :
 "Ouragan" — 4:35
 "Irresistible" — 3:40

 7" single (English version)
A-side :
 "Irresistible" — 3:44
B-side : 
 "Ouragan" — 3:59

 12" maxi (English version)
A-side :
 "Irresistible" (long) — 7:03
B-side :
 "Ouragan" — 4:26
 "Irresistible" (short) — 4:44

 12" maxi (both versions)
A-side :
 "Ouragan" / "Irresistible" (extended version) — 7:00
B-side :
 "Irresistible" — 4:40
 "Ouragan" — 4:35

The single is also available on several of Stéphanie's other albums: Besoin (1986, number six on French Albums Chart, Gold), Stéphanie (1993), Rendez-Vous (2001, track 12), and Ouragan (best of). The song is also on numerous 1980s compilations.

Charts and certifications

Weekly charts

1 Under the title "Irresistible"

Year-end charts

Certifications

References

External links
 "Ouragan", lyrics
 "Irresistible", lyrics
 "Ouragan", music video

1986 debut singles
Princess Stéphanie of Monaco songs
1986 songs
SNEP Top Singles number-one singles
Songs written by Romano Musumarra